Viik is a surname of both Finnish and Estonian origin. Viik may refer to:

Jaan Viik, Estonian Holocaust perpetrator
Linnar Viik (born 1965). Estonian information technology scientist and entrepreneur
Tommi Viik (born 1987), Finnish footballer
Tõnu Viik (astronomer) (born 1939), Estonian astronomer
Tõnu Viik (philosopher) (born 1968), Estonian philosopher 

Estonian-language surnames